is a 2011 song by Hello! Project Mobekimasu. The song is a collaboration between Hello! Project acts Morning Musume, Berryz Kobo, Cute, Erina Mano, and Smileage. The single was released on November 16, 2011 on the label Zetima.

Participants 
 Morning Musume
 Berryz Kobo
 Cute
 Erina Mano
 S/mileage

Release information 
The CD single was released in 7 versions: Regular Edition and Limited Editions A, B, C, D, E, and F. Limited Edition A included a bonus DVD containing a music video for the title song; all the other editions were CD-only.

Music video 
The dance sequence appeared in the music video was choreographed by Lucky Ikeda.

Critical response 
Hotexpress' Tetsuo Hiraga noted that when watching the music video for the first time he had the impression the song was a declaration of war against other idol groups, particularly the current leader of the idol scene AKB48. The reviewer stated that the song was a characteristic of Tsunku mix of disco and pop. When listening to it, he was impressed with the pool of talent in Hello! Project, as each girl has her distinctive voice, look, and manner of expression.

Track listing 
All songs written and composed by Tsunku.

Regular Edition, Limited Editions A 

 Limited Edition A bonus
 Event ticket lottery card with a serial number (sealed into plastic CD wrap)

Limited Edition B

Limited Edition C

Limited Edition D

Limited Edition E

Limited Edition F

Charts

References

External links 
 CD single profile on the Up-Front Works official website
 CD single profile on the Hello! Project official website

2011 singles
Japanese-language songs
Morning Musume songs
Cute (Japanese idol group) songs
Berryz Kobo songs
Angerme songs
Songs written by Tsunku
Song recordings produced by Tsunku
Zetima Records singles
2011 songs